The 1987 South African Open was a men's tennis tournament played on outdoor hard courts in Johannesburg, South Africa that was part of the 1987 Nabisco Grand Prix. It was the 84th edition of the tournament and was held from 16 November through 22 November 1987. First-seeded Pat Cash, who entered the main draw on a wildcard, won the singles title.

Finals

Singles
 Pat Cash defeated  Brad Gilbert 7–6, 4–6, 2–6, 6–0, 6–1
 It was Cash' 3rd and last singles title of the year and the 5th of his career.

Doubles
 Kevin Curren /  David Pate defeated  Eric Korita /  Brad Pearce 6–4, 6–4

References

External links
 ATP tournament profile
 ITF – tournament edition details

South African Open
South African Open (tennis)
Open
Sports competitions in Johannesburg
1980s in Johannesburg
November 1987 sports events in Africa